Sirje Endre (born 22 February 1945 in Juuru) is an Estonian journalist, politician and entrepreneur.
She was a member of IX Riigikogu.

She has been a member of Pro Patria Union. She is a member of Isamaa and Res Publica Union. In the years 1968–1990, he was a member of the CPSU and was the first secretary of the ELKNÜ TRÜ Committee (during the Komsomol position).

References

Living people
1945 births
Estonian journalists
Estonian businesspeople
Pro Patria Union politicians
Isamaa politicians
Members of the Riigikogu, 1999–2003
Women members of the Riigikogu
Recipients of the Order of the National Coat of Arms, 5th Class
University of Tartu alumni
People from Rapla Parish
21st-century Estonian women politicians